Christ's School, Ado Ekiti is a day and boarding, government-owned secondary school located in Ado Ekiti, Ekiti State, Nigeria. Originally conceived as a boys school, it attained a co-educational status when, in 1966, it was merged with its girls arm, known then as Ekiti Anglican Girls Secondary School (EAGSS). However, it runs today as a boys school, independent of the girls arm, situated directly opposite to it.

History
It was founded on 30 June 1933 by the  British missionary, Archdeacon Henry Dallimore. Originally christened 'Ekiti Central School,' it began as a co-educational secondary school, taking students into classes V and VI. It took the name, 'Christ's School, Ado Ekiti,' following the recommendation of Sir Bernard Henry Bourdillon, the governor of then Northern and Southern Protectorates of Nigeria. In 1936, it relocated to its permanent and current site, the Agidimo Hills. It was conceived as an attempt to advance secondary school education in Ekitiland and Western Nigeria in an atmosphere where discipline, diligence and academic excellence would be nurtured and guaranteed.

'The total impact of the education to be given was to make the individual a useful person to himself and his community'. 'For this reason, initial subjects taught in The School included the following outside the normal academic subjects: Tailoring, Brick-making, Plastering, Building, Carpentry for boys and Weaving and Knitting for girls. Agriculture and Cattle keeping were added in 1945, thus by many decades before, Christ's School was already doing what today's 6-3-3-4 and all its other newer variants had been grappling with for decades.'

Much of the funding of its administration came from the Directorate of Education of the Christian Missionary Society (later Anglican Communion - Church of Nigeria)'under the direct supervision of Henry Dallimore, the District Education Superintendent of CMS schools. In 1942, the school attained a full high school status, enlarging its capacity to admit students into classes other than classes V and VI. In consequence, Henry Dallimore became the High Master (equivalent of principal).

The school has huge reputation all over Nigeria having produced major talents in fields as diverse as education, medicine, law, history, engineering, governance, banking, administration, diplomacy, the arts etc.

The school's official symbol is the Chi Rho christogram with Christus Victor, the school motto represented below the plaque.

Houses
Mason:     Blue
Harding:   Yellow
Dallimore: Green
Babamboni: Red
Ogunlade:  Purple

Notable alumni

Professor Oluwunmi Enoch Longe
Robert Adeyinka Adebayo
Michael Bamidele Otiko
Adegoke Olubummo
J.F. Ade Ajayi
Ladipo Adamolekun 
Niyi Osundare
Michael Omolewa
Olusegun Olutoyin Aganga
Professor Benjamin Oluwakayode Osuntokun
Kayode Fayemi
Bolaji Akinyemi
Christopher Kolade
Ireti Doyle
Henry Dele Alake
Stephen Adebanji Akintoye
Oludamola Osayomi
Bolaji Aluko
Tolu Olukayode Odugbemi
Bimbo Daramola
Prince Adedayo Clement Adeyeye
Gbenga Aluko
Bunmi Famosaya, Mni
Isaac Fola-Alade
Samuel Asabia
Sam Aluko
Iluku-Ayoola Olasoji
Ekundayo Adeyinka Adeyemi
Akin Osuntokun
Eyitayo Jegede
Israel Esan Owolabi
Femi Elufowoju Jr.
Professor Adelola Adeloye
Dapo Abiodun

Gallery

References

Christian schools in Nigeria